The Battle of Fayal was a naval engagement between the United States and the United Kingdom fought in September 1814 during the War of 1812 in the Portuguese city  of Horta, Faial, in the Azores. Three British warships and several boats filled with sailors and marines under assignment for the Louisiana Campaign attacked an American privateer in port. After repulsing two attacks from British troops and sailors, killing one of their commanders, the Americans won a tactical victory and scuttled their ship the following morning to prevent its capture.

The battle took place within the Portuguese Empire, a non-belligerent trading partner of the United States during the war. British forces attempted to make a landing after being repulsed by American forces, but the Portuguese governor and American consul resident on Faial prevented this from happening and the Royal Navy ultimately sailed away to continue its assignment against New Orleans.

Background
The Royal Navy ship HMS Plantagenet of seventy-four guns, commanded by Captain Robert Loyd, was sailing to the West Indies with the thirty-eight gun frigate HMS Rota and the eighteen gun brig-sloop HMS Carnation in preparation for the Louisiana Campaign. On the night of September 26, the three ships were cruising in company in Fayal Roads (Fayal Roadstead) when they spotted the Baltimore clipper , a brig with seven guns and a complement of about ninety men. She was commanded by Captain Samuel Chester Reid, who was not prepared to surrender his ship. Captain Loyd ordered a pinnace under Lieutenant Robert Faussett be sent from Plantagenet to ascertain the nationality of the stranger in port. When the British came within gun range of the American vessel and requested the crew identify themselves, Captain Reid declared he would fire if the British came any closer.

Battle

According to British reports, Lieutenant Faussett was unable to stop his boat in the rough tides and it drifted too close to General Armstrong. The Americans then opened fire with their 9-pound long guns and hit the pinnace. Two men were killed and seven others wounded before the pinnace could retire out of range. Carnation immediately moved in and anchored in front of the American ship to begin negotiations. When discussions failed—and since General Armstrong had fired the first shot in a neutral port—Carnation cut her cable and lowered four boats filled with heavily armed men towards General Armstrong,  while Captain Reid maneuvered the ship closer to shore. The first attack occurred at around 8:00 pm. When the Americans observed the incoming boats they maneuvered again to receive them. In the following skirmish, Carnation was kept out of range by enemy fire and the boats were repulsed with a loss estimated by Reid at twenty dead and twenty wounded. One American was killed and another wounded.

At about 9:00 pm, twelve boats armed with carronades and filled with 180 marines and sailors from Plantagenet and Rota were towed into battle by Carnation, which stopped out of gun range. The boats divided into three divisions for another attack. Lieutenant William Matterface commanded the boats and Carnation provided covering fire. Loyd anchored Rota and Plantagenet a few miles away and they did not participate in the engagement. Just after 9:00 pm the British boats advanced, but accurate American fire and strong currents kept Carnation from closing the range and she was damaged. It took Lieutenant Matterface and his boats until about midnight to reach General Armstrong, largely due to the current but partly because of where Loyd had stopped his ships. While the Americans waited they offloaded three of their cannon and erected a battery. When the British arrived, they attempted to board General Armstrong but American gunners sank two of the British boats before they could get close, captured two more, and killed many boarders with swords and musketry at point-blank range. Lieutenant Matterface and several other officers were killed and no one of sufficient rank survived to lead the remaining Britons.

Altogether 36 sailors of the Royal Navy and Royal Marines were killed in action, and another 93 were wounded. The main action lasted over a half hour and only two Americans were killed. Seven were wounded, including Reid who was hit with a musket ball. Reid's men fired nails, knife blades, brass buttons, and other makeshift projectiles from their cannon which reportedly caused severe pain to the surviving British. After being repulsed the British slowly rowed back to their ships and it was 2:00 am on September 27 when they found them. Captain Loyd's response to the defeat was to send the Carnation back to destroy General Armstrong after daylight but when she arrived, American fire caused further damage so Carnation broke off the attack. A little later Carnation appeared again but Captain Reid had already chosen to scuttle his brig by firing one of his swivel guns straight through the hull. The vessel was boarded while it sank and the British set the sails on fire.

Reid and his crew escaped to shore. The British wanted to land a detachment to search for the Americans but the Portuguese governor and the resident American consul John Bass Dabney prevented them from doing this. Captain Reid and the crew of General Armstrong were credited with helping delay the British attack on New Orleans and when they returned to America they were greeted as heroes. However, later historical analysis showed that this was likely not the case.

The above historical retelling and similar accounts of the Battle of Fayal are disputed by scholars. An English eyewitness and numerous official reports from the American embassy and Portuguese records claim the British squadron intended to seize General Armstrong illegally  and surreptitiously. It would not have made sense for the British to send fully armed launches to ascertain the identity of General Armstrong. This could have been easily done by contacting their own consulate or the American consulate, or simply sending a peace delegation to the ship when it was in dock.

See also
Battle of Rappahannock River
Battle of Doro Passage

Notes

Explanatory notes

Citations

References

External links 
  American Privateers in The War Of 1812:  Examines the myths and facts behind Captain Samuel Reid's sea battle in the Azores and whether Reid's action actually delayed the British squadron and aided General Jackson's defense of New Orleans.

Fayal
Military history of the Atlantic Ocean
Fayal
September 1814 events